Issiaka Ouédraogo (born 19 August 1988) is a Burkinabé footballer who plays as a forward for the Austrian Regionalliga East club FC Mauerwerk.

External links
 
 

1988 births
Living people
Association football forwards
Burkinabé footballers
Burkina Faso international footballers
Sportspeople from Ouagadougou
FC Admira Wacker Mödling players
FC Red Bull Salzburg players
SV Grödig players
Wolfsberger AC players
Hatta Club players
SKU Amstetten players
FC Mauerwerk players
Austrian Football Bundesliga players
UAE Pro League players
2. Liga (Austria) players
Austrian Regionalliga players
Burkinabé expatriate footballers
Expatriate footballers in Austria
Expatriate footballers in the United Arab Emirates
2012 Africa Cup of Nations players
2015 Africa Cup of Nations players
Burkina Faso A' international footballers
2020 African Nations Championship players
Burkinabé expatriate sportspeople in the United Arab Emirates
Burkinabé expatriate sportspeople in Austria
AS SONABEL players